Abbe David Lowell (born April 28, 1952) is an American defense attorney who has represented several high-profile defendants. Lowell has represented numerous high-profile political figures, including Bob Menendez, John Edwards, Jared Kushner, Hunter Biden, Jim Wright, Dan Rostenkowski, Charles Keating, Joseph McDade, Joe Bruno, Gary Condit, and Jim Gibbons, among others.

Early life and education
Lowell was born in 1952. He graduated from Columbia University in 1974, and Columbia Law School  in 1977.

Career
Lowell worked in the U.S. Department of Justice, including a stint as an assistant to Attorney General Benjamin Civiletti. He has been an adjunct professor of law at Georgetown Law Center and Columbia University. He is currently a partner at the firm of Winston & Strawn LLP. He has appeared in the media as a legal affairs expert.

Lowell was chief minority counsel to U.S. House of Representatives Democratic members during the impeachment of Bill Clinton in the Lewinsky scandal.

Lowell has defended political figures including John Edwards, Jim Wright, Dan Rostenkowski, Charles Keating, Gary Condit, former Nevada governor Jim Gibbons, former congressman Joseph McDade, lobbyist Jack Abramoff, and U.S. senator Bob Menendez.

Lowell was part of the defense of Stephen Jin-Woo Kim, a State Department contractor who pleaded guilty to a felony count of disclosing classified American intelligence on North Korea.

As of June 2017, Lowell has represented Jared Kushner and Ivanka Trump in inquiries linked to Russia.

Lowell represented Nickie Lum Davis, who pleaded guilty in August 2020 to illegally lobbying the Trump administration on behalf of international fugitive Jho Low. In 2017, Lowell was also involved in discussions about Low's legal and lobbying efforts, which were designed to end the Justice Department's probe of the embezzlement of around $4.5 billion from the Malaysian state fund 1MDB.

Justice Department investigation
As of December 2020, the United States Department of Justice's Public Integrity Section was investigating Lowell for his role in an alleged "secret lobbying scheme" and potential bribery in exchange for a pardon. Lowell was enlisted by California billionaire Sanford Diller to seek a pardon for his friend Hugh Baras.

Lowell's involvement came to light in an August 28, 2020 court opinion by Judge Beryl Howell that found Lowell's communications were exempt from standard attorney-client privileges "because they potentially contained both evidence of crimes and involved nonlawyer third parties." As part of the alleged bribery-for-pardon scheme, Lowell interacted with the White House Counsel's Office, and "according to documents reviewed by the [Wall Street] Journal, Mr. Lowell and Mr. Diller discussed contacting top officials in the [Trump] administration."

Political and civic activities
In 1982, Lowell ran unsuccessfully for the Maryland House of Delegates as a Democrat. Lowell heads the development committee and is a trustee of the Shakespeare Theatre. He also serves as vice president and general counsel of the Jewish Community Center of Greater Washington in 2020.

References

External links

1952 births
20th-century American Jews
American lawyers
Columbia Law School alumni
Columbia University faculty
Georgetown University Law Center faculty
Living people
People associated with Winston & Strawn
21st-century American Jews
Columbia College (New York) alumni